HMNZS Leander was a light cruiser which served with the Royal New Zealand Navy during World War II. She was the lead ship of a class of eight ships, the Leander-class light cruiser and was initially named HMS Leander.

History 
Leander was launched at Devonport on 24 September 1931. She was commissioned into the Royal Navy as HMS Leander on 24 March 1933. Along with  she served in the New Zealand Division of the Royal Navy.

In August 1937 HMS Leander, on a journey from Europe to New Zealand, carried out an aerial survey of Henderson, Oeno and Ducie, and on each island a British flag was planted and an inscription was nailed up proclaiming: "This island belongs to H.B.M. King George VI."

In 1941 the New Zealand Division became the Royal New Zealand Navy (RNZN) and she was commissioned as HMNZS Leander in September 1941. 

In World War II, Leander served initially in the Pacific and Indian Oceans. Commander Stephen Roskill, in later years the Royal Navy's Official Historian, was posted as the ship's executive officer in 1941. In action on 27 February 1941, she sank the Italian armed merchantman  near the Maldives, rescuing 113 of her crew and taking slight damage. On 23 March 1941, Leander intercepted and captured the Vichy French merchant Charles L.D. in the Indian Ocean between Mauritius and Madagascar. On 14 April, Leander deployed for support of military operations in Persian Gulf and, on 18 April, joined the aircraft carrier  and the light cruiser .

In June 1941, Leander was transferred to the Mediterranean Fleet and was active against the Vichy French during the Syria-Lebanon Campaign. After serving in the Mediterranean, Leander returned to the Pacific Ocean in September 1941.

The task group also included ten destroyers. In the ensuing Battle of Kolombangara, Jintsu was sunk and all three Allied cruisers were hit by torpedoes and disabled. Leander was hit by a single torpedo just abaft 'A' boiler room.  26 crew from the boiler room and the No.1 4-inch gun mount immediately above were killed or posted missing. The ship was so badly damaged that she took no further part in the war. She was first repaired in Auckland, then proceeded to a full refit in Boston.

She returned to the Royal Navy on 27 August 1945. In 1946 she was involved in the Corfu Channel Incident. She was scrapped in 1950.

The superyacht Leander G, owned by Sir Donald Gosling, is named after HMS Leander, the first naval vessel on which he served.

In 2020 Fiji commissioned the RFNS Savenaca, a patrol vessel named after Savenaca Naulumatua, a sailor from Fiji who lost his life while serving on the Leander during the Battle of Kolombangara.

See also 
 Cruisers of the Royal New Zealand Navy
 Action of 27 February 1941

References

Sources

External links
 HMNZS Leander at Uboat.net

Leander-class cruisers (1931) of the Royal Navy
Ships built in Plymouth, Devon
1931 ships
Leander-class cruisers (1931) of the Royal New Zealand Navy
World War II cruisers of New Zealand
Maritime incidents in 1946
Corfu Channel incident